Matthew Lappin (born 17 February 1976) is a former professional Australian rules footballer who played for the St Kilda Football Club and the Carlton Football Club in the Australian Football League (AFL). He currently serves as an AFL coach for the JLC at Hillcrest Christian College Queensland.

Debuting with St Kilda in 1994, Lappin was known as a half-back flanker.

Lappin played in 17 of 22 matches in the 1997 season home and away rounds in which St Kilda qualified in first position for the 1997 Finals Series, winning the club's 2nd minor premiership and 1st McClelland Trophy.

At the end of the 1998 season, Lappin moved to Carlton. Where in the first quarter of the club's round 1 match against  he took a specky on the goal-line which would go on to win the Mark of the Year for 1999.

Throughout his playing career, Lappin was recognized on the field due to his lightly built frame, for which he attracted the nickname "Skinny".

Following his retirement from playing, Lappin remained with Carlton as an assistant coach, as well as acting as a playing assistant coach with the Northern Bullants (as a VFL- listed player). He served as Carlton's forward line coach from 2008 until 2010. In 2011, he shifted into an assistant coaching role at Collingwood.

On August 22, 2015. Lappin played for the Gold Coast Suns reserves team as a result of the team's player shortages due to injuries.

Statistics 

|- style="background-color: #EAEAEA"
! scope="row" style="text-align:center" | 1994
|style="text-align:center;"|
| 37||9||1||1||78||36||114||23||9||0.11||0.11||8.67||4||12.67||2.56||1
|-
! scope="row" style="text-align:center" | 1995
|style="text-align:center;"|
|  22||3||0||0||23||14||37||7||3||0||0||7.67||4.67||12.33||2.33||1
|- style="background-color: #EAEAEA"
! scope="row" style="text-align:center" | 1996
|style="text-align:center;"|
| 22||7||0||0||60||51||111||28||9||0||0||8.57||7.29||15.86||4||1.29
|-
! scope="row" style="text-align:center" | 1997
|style="text-align:center;"|
|  22||20||20||19||154||135||289||57||35||1||0.95||7.7||6.75||14.45||2.85||1.75
|- style="background-color: #EAEAEA"
! scope="row" style="text-align:center" | 1998
|style="text-align:center;"|
|  22||20||20||19||154||135||289||57||35||1||0.95||7.7||6.75||14.45||2.85||1.75
|-
! scope="row" style="text-align:center" | 1999
|style="text-align:center;"|
| 12||25||33||21||246||149||395||115||25||1.32||0.84||9.84||5.96||15.8||4.6||1
|- style="background-color: #EAEAEA"
! scope="row" style="text-align:center" | 2000
|style="text-align:center;"|
| 12||24||33||21||280||145||425||114||44||1.38||0.88||11.67||6.04||17.71||4.75||1.83
|-
! scope="row" style="text-align:center" | 2001
|style="text-align:center;"|
| 12||23||49||33||301||139||440||128||37||2.13||1.43||13.09||6.04||19.13||5.57||1.61
|- style="background-color: #EAEAEA"
! scope="row" style="text-align:center" | 2002
|style="text-align:center;"|
| 12||21||22||20||207||120||327||77||32||1.05||0.95||9.86||5.71||15.57||3.67||1.52
|-
! scope="row" style="text-align:center" | 2003
|style="text-align:center;"|
| 12||22||10||3||284||119||403||103||47||0.45||0.14||12.91||5.41||18.32||4.68||2.14
|- style="background-color: #EAEAEA"
! scope="row" style="text-align:center" | 2004
|style="text-align:center;"|
| 12||22||23||7||323||122||445||114||42||1.05||0.32||14.68||5.55||20.23||5.18||1.91
|-
! scope="row" style="text-align:center" | 2005
|style="text-align:center;"|
| 12||22||25||14||239||132||371||104||45||1.14||0.64||10.86||6||16.86||4.73||2.05
|- style="background-color: #EAEAEA"
! scope="row" style="text-align:center" | 2006
|style="text-align:center;"|
| 12||19||5||9||253||134||387||116||38||0.26||0.47||13.32||7.05||20.37||6.11||2
|-
! scope="row" style="text-align:center" | 2007
|style="text-align:center;"|
| 12||18||21||12||162||95||257||92||25||1.17||0.67||9||5.28||14.28||5.11||1.39
|- class="sortbottom"
! colspan=3| Career
!251
!247
!167
!2715
!1472
!4187
!1121
!414
!0.95
!0.65
!10.31
!5.77
!16.09
!4.20
!1.57
|}

Personal life
Lappin's first daughter Olivia was born on December 4, 1998.

He is the cousin of Nigel Lappin, who played for the Brisbane Bears and Brisbane Lions.

References

External links

 
 Matthew Lappin Profile in Blueseum

1976 births
Carlton Football Club players
St Kilda Football Club players
All-Australians (AFL)
Preston Football Club (VFA) players
Living people
Australian rules footballers from Victoria (Australia)
Australia international rules football team players